Constantin Crudu (born 27 July 1944) is a Romanian boxer. He competed in the men's featherweight event at the 1964 Summer Olympics. At the 1964 Summer Olympics, he defeated Roberto Caminero in the Round of 32 and Jorma Limmonen in the Round of 16, before losing to Stanislav Stepashkin in a quarterfinal.

References

External links
 

1944 births
Living people
Romanian male boxers
Olympic boxers of Romania
Boxers at the 1964 Summer Olympics
Sportspeople from Bucharest
Featherweight boxers